Stanislaw Schayer (born May 8, 1899 in Sędziszów, Poland, died December 1, 1941 in Otwock, Poland) was a linguist, Indologist, philosopher, professor at the University of Warsaw. In 1922, he founded, and was the first director, of the Institute of Oriental Studies at the University of Warsaw. He was a member of the Polish Academy of Arts and Sciences and the Warsaw Scientific Society.

References

Bibliography 
 
 

Indologists by nationality
20th-century Polish philosophers
Academic staff of the University of Warsaw
1899 births
1941 deaths
Polish translators
People from Świętokrzyskie Voivodeship
20th-century translators